was a town located in Aira District, Kagoshima Prefecture, Japan.

As of 2003, the town had an estimated population of 8,022 and the density of 89.28 persons per km2. The total area was 89.85 km2.

On March 22, 2005, Kurino, along with the town of Yoshimatsu (also from Aira District), was merged to create the town of Yūsui and no longer exists as an independent municipality.

External links
 Official website of Yusui in Japanese

Dissolved municipalities of Kagoshima Prefecture
Yūsui, Kagoshima